The National Society Pershing Angels is a military-based drill sorority for women founded in 1965 as a Coed Affiliate drill unit of Pershing Rifles at Morgan State University. It is the oldest continuously operating U.S. national women's college organization dedicated to drill.

Vision 

The National Society of Pershing Angels is charged to foster a spirit of friendship and cooperation among the women in the military department and to maintain a highly efficient drill company.

Motto 

Drill, Service, Social

Symbols

The symbols of Pershing Angels are:

 Official Colors – Royal Blue and white. 
 Mascot - Dove.
 Official Flower – The White Rose.

History 

In 1962, a group of 30 ladies started a society that would become Pershing Angels at Morgan State College now Morgan State University in Baltimore, Maryland.  On February 9, 1965, The National Society of Pershing Angels were formally recognized as a university organization and as a sister unit to Pershing Rifles Company J-8 (then H-15) at Morgan.  Across the Nation other women's affiliates of Pershing Rifles formed during the early 60’s.  Pershing Angels was one of many similar coed affiliates with the same ideals and drill activities recognized by local Pershing Rifles Companies, but not officially sanctioned by Pershing Rifles National Headquarters.

Pershing Angles became part of the Coed Affiliates Pershing Rifles (CAPERS) in 1966 when CAPERS were formed as the first officially recognized nationwide female auxiliary to the National Society of Pershing Rifles.

Pershing Rifles began accepting women as members as early as 1971, but CAPERS continued on until the mid-1980s.  Once CAPERS were disbanded, Pershing Angels units formerly affiliated with CAPERS chose to continue on as a separate organization.

Over the years Pershing Angels have expanded to other Universities which included Company C-16, Florida A&M University, Company C-15, Norfolk State College (presently Co. R-4-5, Norfolk State University), Hampton (Institute) University, and Howard University.

Units

Active undergraduate units
U-8-5 - Coppin State University, Baltimore, MD (Established 2018)
H-4-5 - Alabama A&M University
N-4 - North Carolina A&T State University, Greensboro, NC
O-4 - Virginia State University, Petersburg, VA
P-4-5 - Tuskegee University, Tuskegee, AL
R-4-5 - Norfolk State University, Norfolk, VA 
U-4-5 - Hampton University, Hampton, VA 
A-7-5 - Lincoln University of Missouri, Jefferson City, Missouri (Established 2008)
G-8-5 - Howard University, Washington, DC
J-8-5 - Morgan State University, Baltimore, MD (Established 1965)
A-16-5 - Fort Valley State University, Fort Valley, GA
C-16 - Florida A&M University, Tallahassee, FL

Inactive undergraduate units

T-1 - Central State University
A-4 - St. Augustine's (College) University
K-4-5 - South Carolina State University 
O-4-5 - St. Paul’s College
N-8 - St. Peter's College

Alumnae units

AA-4-5 - Central Virginia Alumnae
AA-8-5 - Greater Maryland Alumnae
AA-16-5 - Greater Atlanta Alumnae 
AB-4-5 - North Carolina Agricultural & Technical State University
AB-8-5 - Howard University Alumnae

Notes

External links
 Pershing Angels National Headquarters Website

Fraternities and sororities in the United States
Women's organizations based in the United States
Pershing Rifles
Student organizations established in 1965
1965 establishments in Maryland
Professional military fraternities and sororities in the United States